Camaçari is a city in Bahia, Brazil. It is part of the Salvador Metropolitan Region (Região Metropolitana de Salvador), being the industrial city of the metropolis. The municipality consists of three districts: Camaçari, Abrantes, and Monte Gordo.

History
The area of Camaçari was inhabited by Tupinambá ethnic group prior to the arrival of the Portuguese. The first Portuguese settlement was in 1558 by two Jesuit priests, João Gonçalves and Antônio Rodrigues. They formed a village called Aldeia do Divino Espírito Santo. Aldeia do Divino Espírito Santo played an important role in the expulsion of the Dutch who arrived in Bahia in the 17th century. Troops under the leadership of bishop D. Mark Teixeira drove out the Dutch in 1624. The name of the village was changed to Vila de Nova Abrantes do Espírito Santo on September 28, 1758 under orders from the Marquiq de Pombal. The Jesuits were also expelled from the area at the same time. Later the village came to be known simply as Vila de Abrantes.

Economy
Several factories and petrochemical plants compose one of the largest industrial areas in Brazil and the largest of the Northeast region of the country. The Brazilian multinational company Braskem, the largest petrochemical company in the Americas by production capacity, owns a major petrochemical complex in Camaçari. It is the largest in Brazil, along with that of Triunfo, which is also owned by Braskem. The city was also home to a large automobile factory owned by the Ford Motor Company.

Notable people
 Fabiano Santacroce - professional footballer
 Lins - professional footballer

See also
 Roman Catholic Diocese of Camaçari

References

Populated coastal places in Bahia
Municipalities in Bahia